Hobart station may refer to:

 Hobart station (Indiana), a disused train station in Hobart, Indiana
 Hobart station (New York), a disused train station in Hobart, New York

See also
 Hobart (disambiguation)